Segars is a surname. Notable people with the surname include:

 Charles Segars (born 1963), Media and Communications executive, National Security consultant, and a Producer/Writer
 Simon Segars (born 1967), former chief executive officer of ARM Holdings plc